Helia is an Australian Lenders mortgage insurance provider.

It may also refer to:

People
Hélia Correia (born 1949), Portuguese novelist, playwright, poet and translator
Helia Bravo Hollis (1901–2001), Mexican botanist
Helia Molina (born 1947), Chilean physician, educator, and politician
Helia Sohani, Iranian inline hockey player
Helia Souza (born 1970), Brazilian volleyball player
Helia, see List of Winx Club characters

Species
Elachista helia, a species of moth in the family Elachistidae
Hamataliwa helia, a species of lynx spider in the family Oxyopidae
Helia (moth), a genus of moths in the family Erebidae
Helia agna, a species of moth in its genus

Other
Haaga-Helia University of Applied Sciences, Finnish university

Feminine given names
Portuguese feminine given names
Spanish feminine given names